James Trapp (born December 28, 1969) is a former American sprinter and American football player and currently a co-owner and Facility Coordinator for D1 Sports Training in Greenville, SC. Trapp earned a Super Bowl ring while playing for the Baltimore Ravens in the 2000 season.

Track and field
Trapp was a World-Class sprinter. At the 1991 World University Games he won a gold medal in the 4 x 100 meter relay. He was a 1992 U.S. Olympic Team alternate in the 4x100 meter relay. At the 1993 IAAF World Indoor Championships, Trapp won the gold medal in the 200 meter dash, with a time of 20.60 seconds.

His personal bests are 10.03 seconds in the 100 meters and 20.17 seconds in the 200 meters, but also competed in the 55 meters, posting a personal best of 6.16 seconds.

Personal bests

External links
 Profile

1969 births
Living people
Sportspeople from Greenville, South Carolina
American football cornerbacks
Los Angeles Raiders players
Oakland Raiders players
Baltimore Ravens players
Jacksonville Jaguars players
Clemson Tigers football players
Clemson Tigers men's track and field athletes
Players of American football from South Carolina
Sportspeople from Lawton, Oklahoma
Track and field athletes from Oklahoma
Track and field athletes from South Carolina
Players of American football from Oklahoma
Universiade medalists in athletics (track and field)
Universiade gold medalists for the United States
World Athletics Indoor Championships winners
Medalists at the 1991 Summer Universiade